Hueypoxtla is a municipality located in the Zumpango Region, the northeastern part of the state of Mexico in Mexico. The municipality is located at a northern pass leading out of the Valley of Mexico and Mezquital Valley. The name comes from Nahuatl meaning "place of great merchants".

Geography 

Hueypoxtla borders Zumpango. It covers a total surface area of 201.54 km2 at an altitude of 6,634 ft. In the
2005 census by INEGI, it reported a population of 39,864.

The town of Hueypoxtla, a municipal seat, has governing jurisdiction over the following communities or towns: Santa María Ajolopan, San Francisco Zacacalco, Tinguistongo, Guadalupe Nopala, Emiliano Zapata and Casa Blanca. The municipality borders the municipalities of Apaxco, Tequixquiac, Zumpango and the state of Hidalgo (Tizayuca, Tolcayuca, San Agustín Tlaxiaca and Ajacuba).

The municipal seat is in a small, elongated valley but most of the municipality is a transitions from the Valley of Mexico to the Mezquital Valley.

Flora and fauna 

Hueypoxtla is a big municipality but there is only a part of  a mountain region with oak, yucca, huizache, mesquite and pirul, mainly has got semi-desert plains named Lomas de España (Spain plains) with Zumpango municipality. The plants are fruit trees as capulin, white zapote, avocado, tejocote, and cactus as prickly pears, chollas, and others. In the colonial period settlers planted olive trees, pomegranates, figs and vineyards by soil acidity.

The animals are cacomistle, skunk, opossum, bobcat, coyote, rabbit, hare, the birds are turkey vulture, falcon, eagle, quail, owl, roadrunner, crow and various kinds of insects and reptiles.

History 
In Hueypoxtla, fossils of plants and animal species from the Cretaceous have been found. While there is no evidence in this municipality of human groups, the proximity to Tequixquiac municipality, where the sacrum bone of Tequixquiac was found, suggests that humans inhabited the region.

Around 1219 the altepetl of Hueypoxtla was founded by Chichimecas in a place named Iztatzacuala by Huitzitl, a Chichimeca man.

When they arrived here, Nahuas and Otomis founded Teotlalpan; it's possible that this region was named Teotlalpan for its lime areas, a material used for the building of teocallis, buildings for religious activities.

Communication and transport 
The Arco Norte, is a main highway that passes near Hueypoxtla and connects Atlacomulco to San Martín Texmelucan; Santa María Ajoloapan has toll access to the highway.

Politics

Economy 
The economy is principally based on farming, cattle and small businesses, producing corn, beans and fruit. Tourists are attracted by its climate and some notable churches, as well as some ecotourism attractions. It has an unexplored archeological zone.

Demography

Populated places in Hueypoxtla

Culture

Monuments 
Assumption of Mary Parish' in Santa María Ajoloapan town.Saint Bartholomew Parish  in Hueypoxtla town.Saint Mark Evangelist Parish is in  town.Saint Francis of Assisi Church is in .Presa Luis Espinoza de Hueypoxtla is an dam built in the 19th century.
 Casa Blanca hacienda is a Spanish building connecting with other haciendas and old towns.

 Food and drink 

PeopleJavier Ramirez Flores, a respected man at the age of 94 (2018), has contributed greatly to the education platform in Hueypoxtla. Many educational facilities have been enforced through his effort. He was close to a superintendent of schools throughout this region. A primary school in Hueypoxtla was named in his name. Not to miss, Javier Ramirez was also once Municipal President of Hueypoxtla.Narciso García Flores''', teacher, poet and writer, was an intellectual of Mexican Revolution.

See also
Teotlalpan

References

Hueypoxtla